Forgiven is the fourth single from Christian rock band Skillet's 2009 album Awake, and is the ninth track on the album. The single was released to Christian CHR/Rock radio on August 2, 2010. The song received critical acclaim and was a moderate success. Although it reached number one on both Christian rock radio and CHR, Skillet has never performed it live.

Meaning
Lead Singer John Cooper said this about the song. 'I am really excited about this song, which is probably the most overtly Christian song on the album. I think “Forgiven” is a very hopeful song, and even though it's not the first time a song has been written on the subject, it strikes a balance between being very worship oriented and honest as well. This is a song about letting yourself or someone else down, but finding the power to not beat yourself up over it and to find closure with the person you hurt.'

Charts

Credits
John Cooper - lead vocals, bass guitar
Korey Cooper - rhythm guitar, keyboards
Ben Kasica - lead guitar
Jen Ledger - drums
Tate Olsen – cello
Jonathan Chu – violin

References

External links
Official Skillet website

Skillet (band) songs
2010 singles
Songs written by John Cooper (musician)
Song recordings produced by Howard Benson
Atlantic Records singles
2009 songs
Lava Records singles
Ardent Records singles